"Pyrkiny vähentää" is a song by Finnish rapper Cheek. The song features an appearance by a rapper Spekti. The song serves as the first single from Cheek's seventh studio album Sokka irti. The song debuted and peaked at number ten on the Finnish Singles Chart.  A music video, directed by Juha Lankinen, was uploaded to YouTube on 16 January 2012.

Chart performance

References

2012 singles
Cheek (rapper) songs
2012 songs
Warner Music Group singles